Kigam is a village  in Kupwara district of the Indian union territory of Jammu and Kashmir.

Demographics 
According to the 2011 census of India, Watter Khani has 455 households. The literacy rate of Kigam was 67.55% compared to 67.16% of Jammu and Kashmir. In Kigam, Male literacy stands at 87.54% while the female literacy rate was 12.46%.

Transport

Road 
Kigam is connected by road with other places in Jammu and Kashmir and India through NH 701.

Rail 
The nearest railway stations to Kigam are Sopore railway station and Baramulla railway station both located at a distance of 30.03 kilometres from Kigam.

Air 
The nearest airport is Srinagar International Airport located at a distance of 81.8 kilometres.

See also 
 Watter Khani
 Trehgam
 Wavoora
 Lolab Valley
 Gurez
 Tulail Valley

References 

Villages in Kupwara district